Neolestremia is a genus of midges in the family Cecidomyiidae. The three described species in this genus are known only from India. It was established by Indian entomologist Mahadeva Subramania Mani in 1934.

Species
Neolestremia boerhaaviae Mani, 1934
Neolestremia longipalpa Deshpande, Shaikh & Sharma, 2002
Neolestremia orientalis Sharma & Rao, 1979

References

Cecidomyiidae genera
Insects described in 1934
Taxa named by Mahadeva Subramania Mani
Insects of India